Pankrác is a Prague Metro station on Line C, located in the neighbourhood of Pankrác (part of Nusle) in Prague 4. The station was formerly known as Mládežnická. It was opened on 9 May 1974 with the first section of Prague Metro, between Sokolovská and Kačerov.

A tram extension was constructed to the station in 2021.

The station serves the  shopping centre.

References

Prague Metro stations
Railway stations opened in 1974
1974 establishments in Czechoslovakia
Railway stations in the Czech Republic opened in the 20th century